My Little Pony: Equestria Girls is a Hasbro toy line.

My Little Pony: Equestria Girls may also refer to:

 My Little Pony: Equestria Girls (2017 animated shorts)
 My Little Pony: Equestria Girls (2017 television specials)
 My Little Pony: Equestria Girls (film), 2013
 My Little Pony: Equestria Girls (film series), the film franchise
 My Little Pony: Equestria Girls (web series), 2017 to 2020

See also 
 My Little Pony (disambiguation)